Mozirje is a small town on the Savinja River in northern Slovenia. It is the seat of the Municipality of Mozirje. The area is part of the traditional region of Styria. It is now included in the Savinja Statistical Region.

Name
Mozirje was mentioned in written sources in 1146 as Mosiri (and as Prossperch in 1231, Moziri in 1241, and Prasperch in 1391). The name is derived from the Slovene common noun mozirje 'swamp' and refers to the local geography. In the past the German name was Prassberg.

Church
The parish church in the town is dedicated to Saint George and belongs to the Roman Catholic Diocese of Celje. It was first mentioned in written documents dated to 1241. The current building dates to 1754.

Notable people
Notable people that were born or lived in Mozirje include:
Janez Goličnik (1737–1807), beekeeper

References

External links

 Mozirje on Geopedia

Populated places in the Municipality of Mozirje